Karri (also Romanized as Karrī, Kari, and Korrī) is a village in Bu ol Kheyr Rural District, Delvar District, Tangestan County, Bushehr Province, Iran. At the 2006 census, its population was 641, in 153 families.

References 

Populated places in Tangestan County